The King Olav V's Prize for Cancer Research is a research award given annually by the Norwegian Cancer Society to a researcher who has distinguished himself through his scientific contributions to Norwegian cancer research. It was established in 1992.

Recipients
Source: Norwegian Cancer Society (Norwegian)
 1992 – Per Magne Ueland, Institute of Pharmacology of the University of Bergen.
 1993 – Terje Espevik, Institute of Cancer Research and Molecular Medicine of the Norwegian University of Science and Technology (NTNU).
 1994 – Anne-Lise Børresen-Dale, Department of Genetics, Rikshospitalet–Radiumhospitalet.
 1995 – Stein-Ove Døskeland, Institute of Biomedicine of the University of Bergen.
 1996 – Rune Blomhoff, Department of Nutrition, University of Oslo.
 1997 – Sophie D. Fosså, Oncology Department, Rikshospitalet–Radiumhospitalet.
 1998 – Kirsten Sandvig, Department of Biochemistry of the Rikshospitalet–Radiumhospitalet.
 1999 – Per Eystein Lønning, Department of Cancer of Haukeland University Hospital.
 2000 – Anders Waage, Institute for Cancer Research and Molecular Medicine of the NTNU.
 2001 – Erling Seeberg, Microbiological Institute of the Rikshospitalet–Radiumhospitalet.
 2002 – Eiliv Lund, Institute for Society Medicine of the University of Tromsø.
 2003 – Sjur Olsnes, Department of Biochemistry of the Institute for Cancer Research of the Rikshospitalet–Radiumhospitalet.
 2004 – Erlend B. Smeland, Department of Biochemistry of the Institute for Cancer Research of the Rikshospitalet–Radiumhospitalet.
 2005 – Stein Kaasa, Institute of Cancer Research and Molecular Medicine, NTNU
 2006 – Øystein Fodstad, Department for Tumour Biology of the Radiumhospitalet-Rikshospitalet
 2007 – Ragnhild A. Lothe, Department for Cancer Prevention of the Institute for Cancer Research, Rikshospitalet-Radiumhospitalet
 2008 – Hans Einar Krokan, Institute of Cancer Research and Molecular Medicine of NTNU
 2009 – Lars A. Akslen, Gades Institute of the University of Bergen and Haukeland University 
 2010 – Lars Vatten, NTNU 
 2011 – Sverre Heim, Cytogenetic Cancer Section, Radiumhospitalet-Rikshospitalet
 2012 – Claes Göran Tropé, Department of Gynecological Cancer, Oslo University, Radiumhospitalet-Rikshospitalet
 2013 – Olav Dahl, Haukeland University Hospital
 2014 – Harald Stenmark, University of Oslo
 2015 – Rolf Bjerkvig, University of Bergen
 2016 - Kjetil Taskén, University of Oslo
 2017 - Per Ottar Seglen, University of Oslo
 2018 - Vessela Kristensen, University of Oslo
 2019 - Anne Simonsen ; Norwegian Breast Cancer Group (NBCG) (two prizewinners)
2020 - Bjarne Bogen, University of Oslo 
2021 - Bjørn Tore Gjertsen, University of Bergen

See also

 List of medicine awards
 List of prizes named after people

References

 Based on equivalent article on Norwegian wiki

Medicine awards
Norwegian awards
Awards established in 1992